Aljosa Vasic (born 21 April 2002) is an Italian professional footballer who plays as a midfielder for  club Padova.

Club career
Formed on Padova youth system, Vasic made his senior debut on 30 September 2020 against Frosinone for Coppa Italia.

On 31 January 2022, Vasic extended his contract with Padova to 2026 and was loaned to Lecco for the remainder of the season.

Personal life
Vasic born in Italy from Bosnian Serb parents.

References

External links
 
 

2002 births
Living people
People from Camposampiero
Footballers from Veneto
Italian people of Bosnia and Herzegovina descent
Italian footballers
Association football midfielders
Serie C players
Calcio Padova players
Calcio Lecco 1912 players
Sportspeople from the Province of Padua